The following highways are numbered 242:

Canada
 Manitoba Provincial Road 242
 Nova Scotia Route 242
 Prince Edward Island Route 242

Costa Rica
 National Route 242

Germany
 Bundesstraße 242

Japan
 Japan National Route 242

United States
 Arkansas Highway 242
 California State Route 242
 Georgia State Route 242
 Illinois Route 242
 Iowa Highway 242 (former)
 Kentucky Route 242
 Maryland Route 242
 Minnesota State Highway 242
 Missouri Route 242
Montana Secondary Highway 242 (former)
 New York State Route 242
 North Carolina Highway 242
 Ohio State Route 242
 Oregon Route 242
 Pennsylvania Route 242 (former)
 Tennessee State Route 242
 Texas State Highway 242
 Texas State Highway Spur 242
 Farm to Market Road 242 (Texas)
 Utah State Route 242 (former)
 Vermont Route 242
 Virginia State Route 242